In the mathematical discipline of set theory, ramified forcing is the original form of forcing introduced by   to prove the independence of the continuum hypothesis from Zermelo–Fraenkel set theory.

Dana Scott and Robert Solovay realized that the use of constructible sets was an unnecessary complication, and could be replaced by a simpler construction similar to John von Neumann's construction of the universe as a union of sets  for ordinals . Their simplification was originally called "unramified forcing" , but is now usually just called "forcing". As a result, ramified forcing is only rarely used.

References
.
.
.

Forcing (mathematics)